Once in a Lifetime is a three-CD box set by American post-punk/new wave band Talking Heads, released in the United States by Sire, Warner Bros, and Rhino in 2003. The set also includes a DVD containing an expanded version of the music video compilation Storytelling Giant. The discs are packaged in a wide horizontal book that recalls a CD longbox, featuring paintings by Russian artists Vladimir Dubossarsky and Alexander Vinogradov and with art direction by Stefan Sagmeister (for which he received a 2005 Grammy Award for Best Boxed or Special Limited Edition Package). Sagmeister would later work with David Byrne and Brian Eno on their 2008 collaborative album Everything That Happens Will Happen Today.

Only one previously unreleased song appears in this release: the Naked outtake "In Asking Land", previously reworked into the song "Carnival Eyes" on Byrne's 1989 solo album Rei Momo. Other non-album tracks are: "Sugar on My Tongue"—a 1975 studio demo, dating from when the band was still a trio (minus Jerry Harrison); the 1977 non-album single "Love → Building on Fire", the "Psycho Killer" B-side "I Wish You Wouldn't Say That"; and two Naked-era songs – "Sax and Violins" (finished in 1991 for the soundtrack to the film Until the End of the World) and "Lifetime Piling Up" (finished in 1992 for the Sand in the Vaseline compilation). These non-album tracks had all been included on the 1992 compilation Sand in the Vaseline, though three non-album tracks (1975 studio demo "I Want to Live" and 1992's "Gangster of Love" and "Popsicle") remain exclusive to that compilation, in terms of CD releases. Remastered versions of these three tracks were later issued on the digital-only release Bonus Rarities and Outtakes in 2006.

This box set marked the first CD release of "A Clean Break", a 1977 live recording from 1982's The Name of This Band Is Talking Heads. However, that album was remastered and reissued in 2004 as a two-disc set.

Once in a Lifetime contains four previously unreleased "alternate versions", three of which would later be reissued in various forms: "Uh-Oh, Love Comes to Town" and "New Feeling" are the original Tony Bongiovi "pop experiment" mixes, including brass parts and other more "commercial" production techniques that the band ultimately rejected; "Cities" is an alternate take that includes a verse previously heard only in live performances (most notably in a deleted scene from Stop Making Sense); and "Drugs" is an early mix of the song, featuring Robert Fripp on guitar and very different production and instrumentation than the final version. The alternate version of "Cities" was reissued on the 2006 remaster of Fear of Music, while the alternate versions of "New Feeling" and "Drugs" were reissued digitally on Bonus Rarities and Outtakes.

Promo materials for the box set show that the original title of the box would have been More Than Meets The Eye: Talking Heads Box Set.

Track listing

References

2003 compilation albums
Albums produced by Brian Eno
Albums produced by Nick Launay
Albums produced by Steve Lillywhite
Albums produced by Tony Bongiovi
Albums with cover art by Stefan Sagmeister
Albums produced by Jerry Harrison
Albums produced by David Byrne
Talking Heads compilation albums
2003 video albums
Music video compilation albums
Warner Records compilation albums
Warner Records video albums